Vital is an album by Argentine pianist, vocalist and composer Fernando Otero, recorded in 2008 and released on the Harmonia Mundi's World Village label.

Reception
In 2010 Fernando Otero received the Latin Grammy Award for Best Classical Album for Vital.

Track listing
All compositions by Fernando Otero.
  Nocturno  - 2:09
  Aguaribay  - 3:32
  Globalizacion  - 2:23
  Siderata  - 4:05
  La Abundancia  - 4:00
  Danza Preludio 22  - 0:55
  Danza  - 1:32 
  Reforma Mental  - 2:45
  La Casa Vacia  - 6:20
  Noche Iluminada  - 3:21
  Fin De Revision  - 4:41

Personnel 
 Luciano Antinori – photography
 Jeff Bush – trombone
 Chris Colbourn - booking
 Nick Danielson – violin
 Hector del Curto – bandoneon
 Norberto Di Bella – drums
 Scarlett Freund – design
 Pedro Giraudo – acoustic bass
 René Goiffon – executive producer
 Ryan Keberle – trombone
 Gonzalo Pujal Laplagne – photography
 Luis Nacht – tenor saxophone
 Fernando Otero – arranger, piano, producer
 Eduardo Percossi – classical guitar
 Jonathan Powell – trumpet
 Inbal Segev – cello
 Tom Swift – mastering, mixing, recording
 Manuel Valdivia – project coordinator
 Patricio Villarejo –  cello

References

2010 albums